is a video game for the PlayStation 4 developed by Granzella, who confirmed that it is the spiritual successor to their Disaster Report series of games, and several characters from that series also make cameo appearances in the game. The objective of the game is to escape a city ravaged by battles between giant monsters (kaiju), giant robots, and heroes from the famous live action and animated Japanese film and TV series Godzilla, the Ultra Series, Gamera, Patlabor, and Neon Genesis Evangelion.

The game is known in English as City Shrouded in Shadow.

Plot

The game is set in the fictional Ichi City in Japan, which is attacked by mysterious giant monsters called "kyoei" ("giant shadows"). The player chooses between either playing as a man called Ken Misaki or a woman called Miharu Matsuhara (the character may be renamed), with the objective being to try to escape the city with their partner Yuki. 

Early on, the main character witnesses a deal between yakuza, which results in them having to escape from a hitman constantly chasing them throughout the game as well. The escape leads the main character and Yuki around the city, and they learn more about Yuki's past and her connection to the giant shadows.

Cast
Takuya Sato as Ken Misaki
Satomi Akesaka as Miharu Matsubara
Reina Ueda as Yuki Kouno
Ryōta Takeuchi as Hideyasu Otsuka
Yuko Kaida as Risa Kashiwagi
Minoru Kawai as Ryoji Shibata
Toru Nara as Katsuhiro Muto
Madoka Shiga as Toru Fujiwara

Giant Shadows
The main point of this game is to survive the giant monsters or mechas encountered in the 17 levels of the game. Some giants are benevolent, only a threat due to the massive collateral damage they cause, some are malevolent, actively seeking destruction, while others are neutral and indifferent to human life. 

Listed below are the "shadows", grouped by their franchise of origin.

Ultraman
Ultraman (Levels 1 and 14)
Alien Zarab/Imitation Ultraman (Level 1)
Dada A/B/C (Level 11)
Ultraseven (Level 17)
Pandon (Level 17)
Ultraman Taro (Level 14)
Ultraman Tiga (Level 9)
Kyrieloid/Kyrieloid II (Level 9)
Ultraman Zero (Level 14)
Ultraman Belial (Level 14)

Godzilla
Godzilla (Levels 6, 8 and 13)
King Ghidorah (Level 8)
Mothra (Level 3)
Battra (Level 3)
MFS-3 Kiryu (Level 13)

Rebuild of Evangelion
Evangelion Unit-00 (Level 15)
Evangelion Unit-01 (Levels 5, 12 and 15)
Evangelion Unit-02 (Level 15)
Sachiel the 4th Angel (Level 5)
Shamshel the 5th Angel (Level 12)
Sahaquiel the 8th Angel (Level 15)

Gamera (Heisei trilogy)
Gamera (Levels 2, 10 and 16)
Gyaos (Level 10)
Legion Plant (Levels 2 and 16)
Soldier Legion (Levels 2 and 16)

Patlabor
AV-98 Ingram 1 (Levels 4 and 7)
AV-98 Ingram 2 (Level 7)
Type-5G/1C Grau Bear (Level 4)
CRL-98 Pyro-Buster (Level 4)
Type J-9 Griffon (Level 7)
Type M-5 Abraham (Level 7)

Development
The game was announced via teaser website, which opened on September 4, 2015. A seven-day countdown was launched on September 10, 2015. Kyoei Toshi was officially revealed on September 17, 2015. A livestream on the game started on December 14, 2015 via 876TV live stream to show off a game preview.

It was developed by Granzella and directed by Kazuma Kujo. Takashi Watabe was producer on behalf of publisher Bandai Namco. The game launched on October 19, 2017 in Japan. The game's secret costumes were taken from Ultraman, Evangelion and Patlabor. It also includes costumes from previous Disaster Report games.

A secret mission was added to the game if players pre-ordered the game between July 6 and November 15, 2017 where Toro and Kuro show up and they ask help to finish Zettai Anzen Toshi 2.

Kyoei Toshi was released under a Welcome Price version in Japan worth 3,800 Yen on February 29, 2019.

The game features the theme song "Shadow", performed by Mai Iida.

Reception
The game sold 48,935 copies within its first week on sale in Japan, placing it at number two on the all format sales charts.

Famitsu gave the game a 8/8/7/8 [31/40] score.

References

External links
 Official website 

2017 video games
Bandai Namco games
Cancelled PlayStation Vita games
Crossover video games
Godzilla games
Granzella games
Japan-exclusive video games
Kaiju video games
Neon Genesis Evangelion games
Patlabor
PlayStation 4 games
PlayStation 4-only games
Science fiction video games
Ultra Series video games
Video games developed in Japan
Video games set in Japan
Single-player video games